Aeolis Palus is a plain between the northern wall of Gale crater and the northern foothills of Aeolis Mons (Mount Sharp) on Mars.

The NASA Mars Science Laboratory mission landed the Curiosity rover on Aeolis Palus in August 2012. Curiosity spent two (Earth) years exploring the plain as it drove towards Aeolis Mons. The rover left the plain in September 2014 when it reached the mountain's foothills.

Spacecraft exploration
On August 5, 2012, at 10:32 p.m. PDT/mission time (August 6, 2012, at 5:32 UTC), mission control at JPL received a signal from the NASA Curiosity rover that it had successfully landed in "Yellowknife" Quad 51 of Aeolis Palus. The rover's mission is to explore the surface area of Gale Crater focusing first near its landing site on Aeolis Palus and then venturing into the nearby foothills of Aeolis Mons (unofficially, "Mount Sharp") to investigate its geological features and strata.

On September 26, 2013, NASA scientists reported the Mars Curiosity rover detected "abundant, easily accessible" water (1.5 to 3 weight percent) in soil samples at the Rocknest region of Aeolis Palus in Gale Crater. In addition, NASA reported the rover found two principal soil types: a fine-grained mafic type and a locally derived, coarse-grained felsic type. The mafic type, similar to other martian soils and martian dust, was associated with hydration of the amorphous phases of the soil.  Also, perchlorates, the presence of which may make detection of life-related organic molecules difficult, were found at the Curiosity rover landing site (and earlier at the more polar site of the Phoenix lander) suggesting a "global distribution of these salts". NASA also reported that Jake M rock, a rock encountered by Curiosity on the way to Glenelg, was a mugearite and very similar to terrestrial mugearite rocks.

On December 9, 2013, NASA reported that, based on evidence from Curiosity studying Aeolis Palus, Gale Crater contained an ancient freshwater lake which could have been a hospitable environment for microbial life.

On December 16, 2014, NASA reported detecting, based on measurements by the Curiosity rover, an unusual increase, then decrease, in the amounts of methane in the atmosphere of the planet Mars; in addition, organic chemicals were detected in powder drilled from a rock by the Curiosity rover. Also, based on deuterium to hydrogen ratio studies, much of the water at Gale Crater on Mars was found to have been lost during ancient times, before the lakebed in the crater was formed; afterwards, large amounts of water continued to be lost.

Bradbury Landing

"Bradbury Landing" is a named location on Aeolis Palus. It is where the Curiosity rover landed. The coordinates of the landing site are: .  The landing site location was named for science fiction author Ray Bradbury. NASA announced the name on Bradbury's 92nd birthday, August 22, in honor of the author who died a few months earlier on June 5, 2012. Michael Meyer, NASA program scientist for Curiosity, said "This was not a difficult choice for the science team. Many of us and millions of other readers were inspired in our lives by stories Ray Bradbury wrote to dream of the possibility of life on Mars." Bradbury wrote a collection of stories called The Martian Chronicles in the 1940s.  The Curiosity team left a message on Twitter "In tribute, I dedicate my landing spot on Mars to you, Ray Bradbury. Greetings from Bradbury Landing!" NASA released a video of Bradbury reading his poem "If Only We Had Taller Been".

Images

See also
 Aeolis quadrangle/Gale Crater
 List of plains on Mars

References

External links

Aeolis Palus and Aeolis Mons in Gale Crater:
Google Mars scrollable map - centered on Aeolis Palus.
Aeolis Palus - Curiosity rover "StreetView" (Sol 2 - 08/08/2012) - NASA/JPL - 360° Panorama
Aeolis Palus - Curiosity rover Mission Summary - Video (02:37)
Aeolis Palus - Image/Soil Closeup
Aeolis Palus/Aeolis Mons - Image/THEMIS VIS 18m/px Mosaic (Zoomable) (small)
Aeolis Palus /Aeolis Mons - Image/HRSCview
Video (04:32) - Evidence: Water "Vigorously" Flowed On Mars - September, 2012

Aeolis quadrangle
Mars Science Laboratory
Plains on Mars
Rocks on Mars
Water on Mars
Gale (crater)
Articles containing video clips